Oratemnus is a genus of pseudoscorpions in the family Atemnidae.

Species
The genus contains the following species:
Oratemnus afghanicus Beier, 1959
Oratemnus articulosus (Simon, 1899)
Oratemnus boettcheri Beier, 1932
Oratemnus brevidigitatus Beier, 1940
Oratemnus cavernicola Beier, 1976
Oratemnus confusus Murthy and Ananthakrishnan, 1977
Oratemnus curtus (Beier, 1954)
Oratemnus distinctus (Beier, 1948)
Oratemnus indicus (With, 1906)
Oratemnus loyolai Sivaraman, 1980
Oratemnus manilanus Beier, 1932
Oratemnus navigator (With, 1906)
Oratemnus philippinensis Beier, 1932
Oratemnus proximus Beier, 1932
Oratemnus punctatus (L. Koch and Keyserling, 1885)
Oratemnus saigonensis (Beier, 1930)
Oratemnus samoanus Beier, 1932
Oratemnus semidivisus Redikorzev, 1938
Oratemnus timorensis Beier, 1932
Oratemnus yodai Morikawa, 1968

References 

Pseudoscorpion genera
Atemnidae